William Bosworth (died 1650?) was an English poet, known for a posthumous volume of verse from 1651.

Life
He belonged to a family (whose name is sometimes spelt Boxworth) of Boxworth in Cambridgeshire. He wrote much poetry in his youth, but published nothing. He died about 1650.

Works
In 1651 an admiring friend (R. C.) issued The Chast and Lost Lovers Lively shadowed in the persona of Arcadius and Sepha .... To this is added the Contestation betwixt Bacchus and Diana, and certain Sonnets of the Author to Avrora. Digested into three Poems by Will. Bosworth, Gent., London, 1651. It contained Bosworth's poetry, with a dedication to John Finch, Lord Chief Justice of the Common Pleas. Five copies of verses signed respectively L. B., F. L. (Francis Lovelace), E. G. (Edmund Gayton), S. P., and L. C., lament Bosworth's death.

The major poem of the volume is  the Historie of Arcadius and Sepha in two books. It was a romance in the style of Sir Philip Sidney, and non-political, making it unusual for its period.

Notes

Attribution

1650 deaths
17th-century English poets
17th-century English male writers
17th-century English writers
Year of birth unknown
English male poets